Beijing–Tangshan intercity railway is a high-speed railway connecting Beijing and Tangshan in eastern Hebei. The railway opened on 30 December 2022.

From Beijing railway station to Baodi railway station, the Beijing–Binhai intercity railway will share its northern segment with the Beijing–Tangshan intercity railway before continuing southeast-ward to Binhai West railway station.

Overview
The railway will begin at Beijing railway station, which is located in Dongcheng District of Beijing. The Beijing Sub-Center railway station is under construction and will be finished in 2024. And then it crossing into Hebei's Xianghe County. Next it crosses Tianjin's Baodi District to re-enter Hebei at Tangshan City's Yutian County and Fengrun District. Finally, it will terminate at Tangshan railway station.

History 
Construction on the railway was originally scheduled to start in 2009 but the completion has been delayed after a nationwide rail review following the 2011 Wenzhou Rail Incident. Construction was eventually started on 29 December 2015. The railway opened on 30 December 2022.

Stations

References

High-speed railway lines in China
Rail transport in Beijing
Rail transport in Hebei
Tangshan
Railway lines opened in 2022